A hobble skirt was a skirt with a narrow enough hem to significantly impede the wearer's stride.  It was called a "hobble skirt" because it seemed to hobble any woman as she walked. Hobble skirts were a short-lived fashion trend that peaked between 1908 and 1914.

History

The hobble skirt may have been inspired by one of the first women to fly in an airplane. At a 1908 Wright Brothers demonstration in Le Mans, France, Mrs. Edith Ogilby Berg asked for a ride and became the first American woman to fly as a passenger in an airplane, soaring for two minutes and seven seconds. She tied a rope securely around her skirt at her ankles to keep it from blowing in the wind during the flight. According to the Smithsonian Air and Space Museum, a French fashion designer was inspired by the way Mrs. Berg walked away from the aircraft with her skirt still tied and created the hobble skirt based on her ingenuity.

The French fashion designer in the Berg story might have been Paul Poiret who claimed credit for the hobble skirt, but it is not clear whether the skirt was his invention or not.  Skirts had been rapidly narrowing since the mid-1900s.  Slim skirts were economical because they used less fabric.

The hobble skirt became popular just as women were becoming more physically active.

Hobble skirts inspired hundreds of cartoons and comic postcards.  One series of comic cards called it the "speed-limit skirt."  There were several reports of women competing in hobble-skirt races as a joke.

Boarding a streetcar in a hobble skirt was difficult.  In 1912, the New York Street Railway ran hobble-skirt cars with no step up. Los Angeles introduced similar streetcars in 1913. 

Hobble skirts were directly responsible for several deaths.  In 1910, a hobble-skirt-wearing woman was killed by a loose horse at a racetrack outside Paris.  A year later, eighteen-year-old Ida Goyette stumbled on an Erie Canal bridge while wearing a hobble skirt, fell over the railing, and drowned.

To prevent women from splitting their skirts, some women wore a fetter or tied their legs together at the knee.  Some designers made alterations to the hobble skirt to allow for greater movement. Jeanne Paquin concealed pleats in her hobble skirts while other designers such as Lucile offered slit or wrap skirts.

The trend began to decline in popularity at the beginning of World War I, as the skirt's limited mobility did not suit the wartime atmosphere.

The post-hobble skirt era
The next time skirts would be narrow enough to impede movement would be with the sheath skirts of the 1950s, first introduced at the end of the 1940s. Though shorter lengths (from just below the knee to the lower calf) and advances in fabric would enable a little more movement than in the hobble-skirt era, the 1950s sheath skirt's new waist-to-hem tightness, said to reveal the shape of the leg, still created problems of mobility, with split seams a familiar occurrence. Nonetheless, they were widely promoted by designers and the fashion industry, their narrowness exaggerated even more by having models pose with one leg directly in front of the other. Some other skirt styles of the time also had very narrow hems, particularly the knee-length puffball/pouf skirts shown by Pierre Cardin and Yves Saint Laurent from 1958 to 1960. A few of Saint Laurent's 1959 skirts were so narrow at the hem that some fashion writers revived the word "hobble" to refer to them. Sheath skirts remained part of the fashion picture into the early 1960s and then went very much out of style with the rise of the flared miniskirts of the mid- to late sixties and the easy, comfortable clothes of the 1970s.

Toward the end of the seventies, beginning in fall of 1978, some designers began reviving the narrow skirt silhouettes of decades past. Initially, many of them allowed some movement via slits, though not always. Some were so inhibiting that the word hobble was once again used to describe them. When the tight silhouette of the 1950s sheath skirt was revived in the early 1980s, it was somewhat less restricting, as it was now usually produced in stretchier, often knit fabrics and could even be in mini lengths, though there's only so much movement possible in a knee-length or longer skirt that's tight all the way to the hem. These 1980s-style stretch sheath skirts in various lengths have been revived off and on ever since.

In popular culture

Movies and television
 Intolerance: The Dear One (Mae Marsh) wears a makeshift hobble skirt in the hopes of impressing a man.
 Titanic: Rose DeWitt Bukater (Kate Winslet) wears many hobble-skirted gowns throughout the film. Early in the film, she runs across the deck in a beaded hobble skirt, stumbling and tearing it. The skirt nearly causes her to fall overboard.
 The Addams Family: Morticia commonly wears long, black gothic hobble dresses.
Darkwing Duck: Darkwing Duck's girlfriend, Morgana Macawber commonly wears a long, red hobble dress.
 Dick Tracy: Breathless Mahoney (Madonna) appears in a shiny black skintight gown.
 Ugly Betty: In the episode "Icing on the Cake", Amanda (Becki Newton) wears a tight silver rubber hobble dress named the "Amanda".
What a Way to Go!: Louisa May Foster (Shirley MacLaine) is seen in shiny red pencil hobble skirt.
 Static Shock: Daisy Watkins wears a purple pencil hobble skirt in the first few seasons of the show.
 Parade's End: Sylvia Tietjens wears a hobble dress to her mother-in-law's funeral, c. 1912 (episode 2); the gentry disapprove of her stylishness, but the servants admire it.

Music videos
 "Love Religion" — U96

See also
 Corset controversy
 Fetish fashion
 Foot binding
 Gothic fashion
 Pencil skirt

References

External links

 The Hobble Skirt Streetcar, streetcars designed with women wearing these skirts in mind

1880s fashion
1890s fashion
1910s fashion
1920s fashion
1930s fashion
1940s fashion
1950s fashion
Dresses
Fetish clothing
History of clothing (Western fashion)
History of fashion
Skirts